Defending champion John Newcombe successfully defended his title, defeating Stan Smith in the final, 6–3, 5–7, 2–6, 6–4, 6–4 to win the gentlemen's singles tennis title at the 1971 Wimbledon Championships. It was his third Wimbledon singles title.

Seeds

  Rod Laver (quarterfinals)
  John Newcombe (champion)
  Ken Rosewall (semifinals)
  Stan Smith (final)
  Arthur Ashe (third round)
  Cliff Richey (quarterfinals)
  Ilie Năstase (second round)
  Cliff Drysdale (first round)

Qualifying

Draw

Finals

Top half

Section 1

Section 2

Section 3

Section 4

Bottom half

Section 5

Section 6

Section 7

Section 8

References

External links

 1971 Wimbledon Championships – Men's draws and results at the International Tennis Federation

Men's Singles
Wimbledon Championship by year – Men's singles